Give It Up! is a comics adaptation of nine short stories by Franz Kafka drawn by Peter Kuper.

In the introduction, by Jules Feiffer, Kuper's adaptations are described as "riffs, visual improvisations."

The Stories
 A Little Fable
 The Bridge
 Give It Up!
 A Hunger Artist
 A Fratricide
 The Helmsman
 The Trees
 The Top
 The Vulture

References
Kafka, Franz (Writer) and Peter Kuper (Illustrator). Give It Up! And Other Short Stories. Nantier Beall Minoustchine Publishing. 1995. 

Adaptations of works by Franz Kafka